Two-stage presidential elections were held in Finland in 1937. On 15 and 16 January the public elected presidential electors to an electoral college. They in turn elected the President. Whilst Kaarlo Juho Ståhlberg was one vote short of winning on the first ballot, the result was a victory for Kyösti Kallio, who won on the second ballot. The turnout for the popular vote was 57.8%.

Background
The issues the election campaign was fought on included President Pehr Evind Svinhufvud's refusal in September and October 1936 to allow the Social Democrats - then clearly the largest political party in Finland - to enter the government, Prime Minister Kallio's moderate and conciliatory attitude towards the Social Democrats, former President Ståhlberg's second attempt to regain power, and the distribution of the new Finnish economic prosperity among the various social classes, especially labourers and peasants.

Almost one-third of the electors originally supported the Social Democratic candidate, Väinö Tanner, whose supporters conceded that he had no chance of being elected in the bourgeois Finland, but emphasized that his electors could probably decide who would win the presidency.  President Svinhufvud also had almost one-third of the electors behind him (including the right-wing electors of the Swedish People's Party), while both Kallio and Ståhlberg each had just under one-fifth of the electors supporting them.  However, Kallio had the fewest uncompromising opponents in the Electoral College.  This made him easily the second-best choice (after Ståhlberg) for the Social Democrats and the moderate supporters of Ståhlberg.  Thus Kallio won the presidency clearly on the second ballot.  Kallio's victory was helped also by the fact that the ideological quarrels in Finland had calmed down considerably since the early and mid-1930s, given Finland's rising prosperity, the gradually increasing Agrarian-Social Democratic co-operation, and the far right's decreasing support.

Results

Popular vote

Electoral college

References

1937
1937 elections in Finland
January 1937 events